Fraser Valley was a federal electoral district in British Columbia, Canada, that was represented in the House of Commons of Canada from 1925 to 1968 and from 1997 to 2004.

History 
This electoral district has existed twice. It was first created in 1919 from Westminster District. In 1966, it was abolished when it was redistributed into Fraser Valley East, Fraser Valley West and Coast Chilcotin ridings.

It was reformed in 1996 from Fraser Valley East and Fraser Valley West ridings.

It was again abolished in 2003 when it was divided between Abbotsford and Chilliwack—Fraser Canyon ridings.

Members of Parliament

This riding elected the following Members of Parliament:

Election results

Fraser Valley, 1997–2004

Fraser Valley, 1921–1968

See also 

 List of Canadian federal electoral districts
 Past Canadian electoral districts

External links 
 Library of Parliament Riding Profile (1919–1966)
 Library of Parliament Riding Profile (1996–2003)
 Expenditures: 2000
 Expenditures: 1997
 Parliament of Canada website

See also 

 List of Canadian federal electoral districts
 Past Canadian electoral districts

Former federal electoral districts of British Columbia